Andreas Christian Iversen (25 February 1834 Janderup, Denmark – 6 September 1911 Earnscleugh, New Zealand) was a Danish-born New Zealand gold miner, orchardist and irrigator.

References

1834 births
1911 deaths
New Zealand miners
New Zealand horticulturists
Danish emigrants to New Zealand
New Zealand orchardists